is a Japanese football player. He is a registered player for Zweigen Kanazawa, but currently on loan to Suzuka Point Getters.

Career
Ryo Ishii joined J2 League club Mito HollyHock in 2016. He moved on loan to J3 League club Azul Claro Numazu in 2017. After coming back to Mito, he opted for another loan in J3, this time to Fukushima United FC.

Club statistics
Updated to 30 June 2022.

References

External links
Profile at Fukushima United FC

1993 births
Living people
Chukyo University alumni
Association football people from Aichi Prefecture
Japanese footballers
J2 League players
J3 League players
Mito HollyHock players
Azul Claro Numazu players
Fukushima United FC players
FC Ryukyu players
Zweigen Kanazawa players
Suzuka Point Getters players
Association football goalkeepers